Mustafa Shehdeh Abu Romeh (born 5 February 1978) is a Jordanian former footballer who played as a midfielder.

International goals

References
  
 Shehdeh: "Al-Baqa'a SC is Coming Strongly...And Returning to Al-Nashama is Personal"
 Shehdeh: "I Took My Cartilage Treatment Wrong... And I'll Return to Playing Football In the Second Leg of the League"

External links
 
 

1978 births
Living people
Jordanian footballers
Jordan international footballers
Jordanian people of Palestinian descent
Sportspeople from Amman
Association football forwards
2004 AFC Asian Cup players
Al-Baqa'a Club players
Shabab Al-Ordon Club players
Al-Wehdat SC players